Victory Songs is the third studio album by Finnish folk metal band Ensiferum. It was released on 20 April 2007 by Spinefarm. It is the band's first full-length album to feature new members Petri Lindroos, Sami Hinkka and Janne Parviainen, and the last to feature Meiju Enho.

Track listing

Personnel

Band members
 Petri Lindroos – harsh vocals, guitars, banjo
 Markus Toivonen – guitars, clean vocals, acoustic & 12-string guitars, banjo, shaman drum, backing vocals
 Meiju Enho – keyboards
 Sami Hinkka – bass, clean vocals, harsh vocals on "Ahti"
 Janne Parviainen – drums, bodhran

Session/guest musicians
 Johanna Vakkuri - flute
 Euge Valovirta - acoustic guitars
 Petri Prauda - bagpipes
 Vesa Vigman - mandolin, bouzouki, saz
 Kaisa Saari - tin whistle, recorder
 Aleksi Parviainen - additional lead vocals (on Deathbringer From the Sky), backing vocals
 Lassi Logren - nyckelharpa
 Timo Väänänen - kantele
 D.P. - backing harsh vocals

References

2007 albums
Ensiferum albums
Albums with cover art by Kristian Wåhlin